The 1960 Chicago Bears season was their 41st regular season completed in the National Football League. The team finished with a 5–6–1 record under George Halas, finishing fifth in the NFL Western Conference, a game below .500, a rare sight under a Halas coached team. The Bears lost all three games in December by significant margins, the last two being shutouts.

NFL Draft

Roster

Regular season

Schedule 

Note: Intra-conference opponents are in bold text.

Game summaries

Week 1 at Packers

Week 9

Standings

References 

Chicago Bears
Chicago Bears seasons
Chicago Bears